Michiya Mihashi (三橋美智也 Mihashi Michiya, November 10, 1930 – January 8, 1996), born Michiya Kitazawa (北沢 美智也 Kitazawa Michiya) in Kamiiso, Hokkaidō, was an enka singer in postwar Japan. Along with Hachiro Kasuga and Hideo Murata, he was regarded as one of the most notable singers to have established the genre enka.

Mihashi was among the leading Enka singers in his time and was known for his high-pitched and elastic singing voice. He recorded around 2,500 songs. By 1983, he sold more than 100 million records.

Takashi Hosokawa was his pupil.

Biography
Mihasa began his career as a singer of Japanese folk music or min'yō, winning a min'yō competition in his native Hokkaidō at age 11. In 1954, he made his record debut with the song "Sake no Nigasayo" (酒の苦さよ). His 1955 song "Onna Sendō Uta" (おんな船頭唄) became a hit song.

In 1960, he sang the theme song for the tokusatsu series Kaiketsu Harimao, which was created by Shotaro Ishinomori.

In the latter half of the 1970s he reinvented himself, adopting a 'rough' style and hosting a radio program aimed at young men, from whom he acquired the nickname "Michie" (ミッチー). In 1983, he set a record by becoming the first Japanese singer in history to sell one hundred million records.

Mihasa died in hospital in Osaka on January 8, 1996, from multiple organ failure at the age of 65.

Discography 
  : 1955
  : 1955
  : 1956
  : 1956
  : 1959
  : 1961
 "Tsugaru Jongara Bushi" (with Takeshi Terauchi & Bunnys) : 1967

See also 
 Best selling music artists

References

External links 
 Website in King Records 

1930 births
1996 deaths
Enka singers
Deaths from multiple organ failure
Japanese racehorse owners and breeders
Musicians from Hokkaido
20th-century Japanese male singers
20th-century Japanese singers